Ángel Guillermo Hoyos (born 9 June 1963), known as Guillermo Hoyos, is an Argentine football manager and former player who played as a midfielder.

Career

Playing career
Hoyos hails from Villa Maria, Cordoba, Argentina and has played club football for Boca Juniors, Banfield, Gimnasia LP, Talleres de Cordoba, Chacarita Juniors in Argentina, Deportes Tolima and Unión Magdalena (Colombia), Everton de Viña del Mar (Chile), Deportivo Táchira, Minerven, El Vigía F.C (Venezuela) Club Blooming (Bolivia), Sport Boys (Peru) Real Madrid Castilla (Spain).

With Boca Juniors he won the championships in Argentina, Copa Libertadores, Super Copa and Copa Oro.

He played in the National Olympic Team of Argentina and the National team of Argentina.

Managerial career
As a coach, he worked for four years at Barcelona B, where he discovered Lionel Messi, additionally he has won the youth championship twice, before he went to Greece, he first appeared in the Summer of 2006 where he was in Aris Thessaloniki in the year when he returned from the League and made it a purely Latin team playing offensive football that was at the time missing in the Greek league.

Anorthosis confirmed Hoyos appointment on 26 May 2010, and he officially took up the team on 31 May. Hoyos, had completely changed the squad of Anorthosis Famagusta, by transferring players known for their speed from all over the positions of the field. He is also famous for his ambitions of offensive football, and the formation of 4–3–3 who had established to Anorthosis. Hoyos was not a holder of the UEFA Pro coaching license, therefore Anorthosis recruited Bulgarian coach Vasil Simov as "virtual" first coach, and the Argentine was declared as technical director during Anorthosis matches. This did not work and Hoyos was released from his contract on November 17, 2010.

On 3 November 2013 he signed a contract with Greek Football League club Iraklis.

References

External links

1963 births
Living people
Argentine footballers
Argentine expatriate footballers
Segunda División players
Argentine Primera División players
Categoría Primera A players
Real Madrid Castilla footballers
Talleres de Córdoba footballers
Club Atlético Banfield footballers
Boca Juniors footballers
Chacarita Juniors footballers
Club de Gimnasia y Esgrima La Plata footballers
Everton de Viña del Mar footballers
Deportes Tolima footballers
Unión Magdalena footballers
Club Blooming players
Deportivo Táchira F.C. players
Expatriate footballers in Spain
Expatriate footballers in Chile
Expatriate footballers in Colombia
Expatriate footballers in Venezuela
Expatriate footballers in Bolivia
Expatriate footballers in Peru
Expatriate football managers in Chile
Expatriate football managers in Bolivia
Expatriate football managers in Colombia
Expatriate football managers in Greece
Argentine football managers
Aris Thessaloniki F.C. managers
Atromitos F.C. managers
Iraklis Thessaloniki F.C. managers
Once Caldas managers
Talleres de Córdoba managers
North American Soccer League coaches
Oriente Petrolero managers
Bolivia national football team managers
Jacksonville Armada FC coaches
PAS Giannina F.C. managers
Universidad de Chile managers
Association football midfielders
Atlas F.C. managers
Aldosivi managers
Footballers from Córdoba, Argentina
Argentine expatriate sportspeople in Spain
Argentine expatriate sportspeople in Colombia
Argentine expatriate sportspeople in Chile
Argentine expatriate sportspeople in Venezuela
Argentine expatriate sportspeople in Bolivia
Argentine expatriate sportspeople in Greece